Monex Precious Metals is a United States bullion dealer that buys and sells precious metals to retail clients headquartered in Newport Beach, California.  The company offers Gold, Silver, Platinum and Palladium coins, bars, bullion rounds, collectibles and other numismatics products from various mints around the world.

History
The company was founded in 1987 in California.

In 2017, the CFTC charged the company with defrauding 3,000 clients, accusing the company of making false claims to investors, mostly to the elderly, in television commercials. The company rejected the charge saying that the CFTC did not have jurisdiction over it.

References 

Bullion dealers
Financial services companies of the United States
1987 establishments in the United States
Companies established in 1987
Financial services companies established in 1987
Companies based in Newport Beach, California